The 2020 MTV Video Music Awards were held on August 30, 2020. Keke Palmer hosted the 37th annual ceremony, which was presented primarily from New York City, but with a virtual ceremony due to the COVID-19 pandemic. This was the first VMA ceremony to be broadcast on The CW.

Lady Gaga was the most awarded act of the night with five awards, as well as the most nominated alongside Ariana Grande, with both artists receiving nine nominations each. Gaga was presented with the inaugural MTV Tricon Award for achievements in three or more fields of entertainment. The longlist of nominees for Push Best New Artist were revealed on July 23, 2020; nominees for other categories were announced on July 30. Fan voting began on July 30 and ended on August 23. Nominees for Song of Summer, Best Group and Everyday Heroes: Frontline Medical Workers were released on August 24. The show was dedicated to Chadwick Boseman, who died of colon cancer two days before the ceremony. The show received 6.4 million viewers in its first-run viewing (excluding livestreams through network apps), a 5% decrease from the 6.8 million viewers at the previous ceremony.

Ceremony information
The awards were originally scheduled to return to the Barclays Center for the first time since 2013. Due to the COVID-19 pandemic, the event was expected to be held with "limited or no audience", as one of the first major indoor events to be held in the city since the onset of the pandemic in the state, with MTV also announcing plans for the show to "[span] all five boroughs" to "pay homage to the strength, spirit and incredible resilience of NYC and its beloved residents".

MTV eventually scrapped the indoor component of the ceremony at Barclays after "close consultation with state and local health officials" and announced that it would be conducted in an outdoor format across the city; the arena in Brooklyn would subsequently host the 2021 event instead. The majority of performances were pre-recorded either in New York City (with locations such as Hudson Yards and a drive-in theatre in Brooklyn), or on a chroma key set at the MTV studios headquarters with New York scenery for acts unable to travel to New York City (primarily in Los Angeles, and Seoul in the case of BTS). All personnel not from New York City were required to quarantine for three to four days on arrival, and be tested before and after filming. Red carpet appearances and some speeches were also recorded during the same sessions.

New one-off award categories for "Quarantine Performance" and "Best Music Video from Home" were added on July 30 in light of the ongoing pandemic. Three additional categories were announced on August 24: Song of Summer, Best Group and "Everyday Heroes: Frontline Medical Workers", with the latter created "to celebrate performances by COVID-19 first responders".

In addition to the ViacomCBS family of networks, the VMAs were also simulcast on terrestrial television by The CW (a joint venture of ViacomCBS and WarnerMedia). The CW also aired a post-show recap special, composed mostly of pre-show performance footage.

Performances

J Balvin and Roddy Ricch were initially announced as performers on August 4 and 11 respectively, but later pulled out of the event.

Presenters
Presenters were announced on August 27.

Pre-show
 Nessa and Jamila Mustafa – presented Best Group and Best K-Pop
 Travis Mills – presented Best Alternative

Main show
 Jaden Smith – presented Best Collaboration
 Drew Barrymore – presented Best Direction
 Anthony Ramos – presented Best Latin
 Joey King – presented Song of the Year
 Madison Beer – presented Best Music Video from Home
 Nicole Richie – presented Best Pop and Best R&B
 Kelly Clarkson – presented Artist of the Year
 Sofia Carson – presented Video for Good
 Bella Hadid – presented the Tricon Award
 Travis Barker – presented Best Hip Hop and introduced the "In Memoriam" segment
 Machine Gun Kelly – presented Push Best New Artist
 Bebe Rexha – presented Video of the Year

Winners and nominees
On July 23, 2020, seventeen Push Best New Artist pre-nominees were announced. Fan voting for most categories took place from July 30 to August 23. Nominees for most other categories were revealed on July 30. Nominations for remaining categories were announced August 24. The Push Best New Artist category was narrowed down to three finalists on August 24 and voting moved to Twitter, where it continued until August 28. Voting for Best Group and Song of Summer ran from August 24–26 and August 26–28 respectively, and took place via MTV's Instagram stories. Lady Gaga was the most-awarded nominee with five wins, followed by Ariana Grande and BTS with four each.

Winners are listed first and highlighted in bold.

References

External links

MTV Video Music
MTV Video Music Awards
MTV Video Music Awards
MTV Video Music Awards
MTV Video Music Awards
MTV Video Music Awards
MTV Video Music Awards ceremonies